The name Javier has been used for seven tropical cyclones in the Eastern Pacific Ocean.
 Hurricane Javier (1980) – stayed in the open ocean. 
 Hurricane Javier (1986) – produced high waves in southern California. 
 Hurricane Javier (1992) – dissipated south of Hawaii. 
 Tropical Storm Javier (1998) – made landfall in southwestern Mexico, dissipated shortly after moving ashore.
 Hurricane Javier (2004) – made landfall in Baja California; later produced rainfall across the southwest United States.
 Tropical Storm Javier (2016) – struck Baja California, degenerated into a remnant low shortly after passing offshore.
 Tropical Storm Javier (2022) – formed near Baja California but did not make landfall, dissipated shortly after.

See also  
Tropical Storm Xavier – a similar name which is also included in the Eastern Pacific lists.

Pacific hurricane set index articles